Will Little III (born April 9, 1998) is an American professional soccer player.

Career
Little signed with United Soccer League side Swope Park Rangers on March 10, 2016 from Sporting Kansas City's academy.

Career statistics

References

External links 
 Swope Park Rangers Profile.
 

1998 births
Living people
American soccer players
Sporting Kansas City II players
Association football midfielders
Soccer players from Tennessee
People from Johnson City, Tennessee
USL Championship players